A tier list is a concept in video game culture where playable characters or other in-game elements are subjectively ranked by their respective viability as part of a list. Characters listed high on a tier list of a specific game are considered to be powerful characters compared to lower-scoring characters, and are therefore more likely to be used in high-level competitive settings like tournaments. Tier lists are a popular method of classifying the cast of playable characters in fighting games such as the Street Fighter and Super Smash Bros. series; multiplayer online battle arena titles such as League of Legends and Dota series; hero shooter titles such as Overwatch and Apex Legends; and action role-playing games with playable party members like Genshin Impact.

Tier lists have been used to rank elements from other subjects aside from video games, such as films, sports teams, logos, animals, elements of tabletop games and private housing estates. Tier lists have been a popular phenomenon on the livestreaming platform Twitch since 2015–2016.

Methodology
When a competitive game gets an update, a question that arises is how the changes in the game will affect the tier list. Even when no balancing changes actually took place, the inclusion of new characters or new systems can affect tier lists. In fighting games, the strength of a character is always held relative to that of other characters, meaning that something that is strong in one fighting game does not necessarily have to be strong in another. The metagame may shift over time as dominant strategies get overturned using less popular characters.

Tier rankings may be listed using letter gradings. The competitive community surrounding Guilty Gear Xrd, for instance, ranks characters as 'S', 'S-', 'A+', and 'A', where 'S tiers' are particularly powerful and 'A tiers' less so. Major video game news websites such as The Daily Dot, Kotaku and PC Gamer have published their own tier lists for popular games.

For a game like Super Smash Bros. Melee, which was released in 2001 and has not been updated since, but is still popular in tournament settings, characters originally overpowered tend to remain that way, due to their inability to receive character balancing updates. However, characters initially believed to be poor can climb in later tier lists if new techniques are discovered that improve their viability. Different versions of the game may have different tier lists as well. The website Smashboards bases its yearly tier lists for the Super Smash Bros. series on polling results.

Impact
Writing for Kotaku, Maddy Myers noted that characters that are considered low-tier have an advantage over higher-tiered characters, as players have less experience dealing with low-tier characters and often underestimate them. Myers stated that "the element of surprise can only get you so far, but it's still an undeniable asset. And one that the bottom third of every tier list enjoys." Already popular characters may also rise in tier lists because high-level players establish and iterate on their combos and techniques. Myers also noted that tier lists are less useful in team-based games, because character roles and team composition introduce a complex set of variables.

References

Rankings
Esports terminology
Video game culture
Video game memes